Asteridea archeri  is a herb in the family Asteraceae, which is endemic to Western Australia.  It was first described in 2000 by Philip Short.  It is found growing on gypsum dunes in salt lakes to heights from 20 cm to 1 m. Its white flowers may seen from September to October in Beard's Eremaean Province.  There are no synonyms.

References

External links 
 Asteridea archeri occurrence data from the Australasian Virtual Herbarium

archeri
Endemic flora of Western Australia
Eudicots of Western Australia
Plants described in 2000